Attagis  is a genus of seedsnipe, a  South American family of small gregarious waders which have adapted to a vegetarian diet.

These birds look superficially like partridges in structure and bill shape. They have short legs and long wings. Their 2-3 eggs are laid in a shallow scrape on the ground.

The genus was erected by the French ornithologists Isidore Saint-Hilaire and René Lesson in 1831 with the rufous-bellied seedsnipe (Attagis gayi) as the type species. The name Attagis is the word used for a game bird in Ancient Greek texts. It probably referred to the black francolin (Francolinus francolinus).

Species 
The genus contains two species:

These are the larger of the four seedsnipe species.

References

 Shorebirds by Hayman, Marchant and Prater  

 
Bird genera
 
Taxa named by René Lesson